Annbank United Football Club are a Scottish football club from Annbank, South Ayrshire. Formed in 1939, they are based at New Pebble Park and are nicknamed "The Bankies".

The club reached the final of the 1952–53 Scottish Junior Cup, losing 1–0 to Vale of Leven in front of 55,800 spectators at Hampden Park. Annbank had required thirteen matches to negotiate the seven rounds to the final.

In June 2016, Annbank appointed Graeme Neil and Tom Robertson of the Ayr United Football Academy as their new management team. The duo had worked the previous season at Lugar Boswell Thistle, bringing Ayr's pro-youth players into an adult game environment.

On 14 May 2021 Annbank announced on their Twitter account that they would suspend their participation in the newly formed West of Scotland Football League for season 2021-22 whilst retaining full membership, but hoped to return in the next season. In the interim, the club will compete in the Ayrshire Amateur Division 2A and continue to play out of New Pebble Park.

Honours
 Scottish Junior Cup runners-up: 1952–53
 Ayrshire Second Division winners: 1989–90
  Western League (Southern) winners: 1948–49
 Ayrshire (Ayrshire Weekly Press) Cup winners: 1940–41, 1943–44, 1945–46
 Ayrshire League (Rockware Glass) Cup winners: 1987–88
 Kyle & Carrick Cup winners: 1984–85, 1986–87, 1987–88, 1990–91, 1992–93
 South Ayrshire Cup winners: 1997–98
 Ayrshire Super Cup winners: 1987–88
 Western League Cup winners: 1942–43, 1943–44
 Ayrshire Consolation Cup winners: 1951–52, 1955–56
 Irvine & District Cup winners: 1943–44
 Moore Trophy: 1954–55
 Vernon Cup winners: 1951–52, 1955–56
Henderson Memorial Shield:1956
(shared with Dwinethorpe Rovers)
Ferguson Invitational: 1970
Vietnam Mid-Autumn Cup:1985

References

External links
 Official Website
 Facebook
 Twitter

 
Football clubs in Scotland
Football in South Ayrshire
Association football clubs established in 1939
West of Scotland Football League teams
Scottish Junior Football Association clubs
1939 establishments in Scotland